Sam Adkins may refer to:

 Sam Adkins (American football) (born 1955), American football player
 Sam Adkins (footballer) (born 1991), football midfielder
 Sam Adkins (fighter) (born 1965), American mixed martial artist